The Commoner Party of Thailand was a political party in Thailand founded on 3 March 2014 by Tanaporn Sriyakul, its leader. On 20 April 2014 the Commoner Party of Thailand organized the party's first, announcing ideologies and policy to amend the lèse majesté law or article 112

On 19 April 2019, the Commoner Party held a party executive committee meeting, No. 2/2019, at which it resolved to dissolve the party. This would come into effect on the date of its publication in the Government Gazette, 11 June 2019.

References

External links

2014 establishments in Thailand
2019 disestablishments in Thailand
Defunct political parties in Thailand
Left-wing parties in Thailand
Liberal parties in Thailand
Political parties disestablished in 2019
Political parties established in 2014
Progressive parties